eFootball.Open, known as PES League prior to 2020, is the showpiece event at the end of the competitive PES Season for 1v1 competition. The event was originally founded in 2003 and has historically determined the official 1vs1 e-sports world championship of the soccer videogame Pro Evolution Soccer. Between 2003 and 2010, the event was open to selected European countries and since 2010, the event has been open to selected countries globally.
eFootball.Pro is a 3v3 team competition open to teams of players contracted by professional football clubs and is the successor to the team event held at PESLeague since 2018. Players who have historically done well in the eFootball.Open competitions are more likely to be contracted by a professional club to represent them in the team event. The current PES 3vs3 World Champions are the Brazilian team "eLiga Sul Stars" who won the 3s3 PES League finals on 29 June 2019 along with the top team prize of 75.000  split between the team.

All Editions

Individual tournament (1v1) - eFootball.Open

CO-OP tournament (3v3)

Most successful players 
This table shows the most decorated players from the 1v1 Championship. Those who have won the Championship and placed top three in another are included.

References

External links 
 PES League official website

Pro Evolution Soccer competitions